2,4,6-Tri-tert-butylpyrimidine is the organic compound with the formula HC(ButC)2N2CtBu where tBu = (CH3)3C.  It is a substituted derivative of the heterocycle pyrimidine.  Known also as TTBP, this compound is of interest as a base that is sufficiently bulky to not bind boron trifluoride but still able to bind protons.  It is less expensive that the related bulky derivatives of pyridine such as 2,6-di-tert-butylpyridine,  2,4,6-tri-tert-butylpyridine, and 2,6-di-tert-butyl-4-methylpyridine.

References

Pyrimidines
Reagents for organic chemistry
Non-nucleophilic bases
Tert-butyl compounds